Abdijen in de lage landen was a 1989 Belgian documentary television series directed by Jan Gruyaert. A total of 11 episodes were produced lasting 26 minutes each. The show was in Dutch. It was a colored television program produced by Abbey Film Productions.

External links

Flemish television shows
Belgian television documentaries
1989 Belgian television series debuts
1980s Belgian television series